"So Done" (stylised in all caps) is a song by Australian singer and rapper the Kid Laroi, released on 23 October 2020 as the first single (fourth overall) from the deluxe edition of Laroi's debut mixtape F*ck Love, released on 24 July 2020. The song was produced by Khaled Rohaim and Omer Fedi.

Music video
In the Cole Bennett-directed music video, Laroi encounters his ex-girlfriend and her new boyfriend wherever he goes. The music video has more than 35 million views as of October 2021.

Composition
So Done is similar to most of the songs on F*ck Love (Savage). The song is about how Laroi has been in broken relationships, that did not work. Therefore, he notes that he is giving up on love and is not looking for a new girlfriend, because he expects it to happen again.

Chart performance
In the Kid Laroi's native Australia, "So Done" peaked at number six on the ARIA Singles Chart. On the US Billboard Hot 100, it peaked at number 59, becoming the Kid Laroi's third Hot 100 entry.

Credits and personnel
Credits adapted from Tidal.
 The Kid Laroi – vocals, songwriting
 Khaled Rohaim – songwriting, production
 Omer Fedi – songwriting, production
 Donn Robb – record engineering
 Jon Castelli – mixing
 Josh Deguzman – assistant engineering
 Chris Gehringer - mastering

Charts

Weekly charts

Year-end charts

Certifications

Release history

References

External links 
 

2020 singles
2020 songs
The Kid Laroi songs
Songs written by the Kid Laroi
Columbia Records singles
Music videos directed by Cole Bennett
Sony Music singles
Song recordings produced by Omer Fedi
Songs written by Khaled Rohaim
Songs written by Omer Fedi